Schizolachnus is a genus of true bugs belonging to the family Aphididae.

The species of this genus are found in Europe and Northern America.

Species:
 Schizolachnus curvispinosus
 Schizolachnus flocculosus

References

Aphididae